Synema globosum is a species of spiders belonging to the family Thomisidae (crab spiders). It is sometimes called the Napoleon spider, because of a supposed resemblance of the markings on the abdomen to a silhouette of Napoleon wearing his iconic hat.

Description
They can mostly be encountered  from May through August on flowering plants (especially yellow or red Apiaceae species), waiting for their prey.

The two pairs of the front legs, used for hunting the flower-feeding insects, are more developed than the rear ones, which have a predominant motor function.

A striking feature of this species is the variation in colour among females. Mature males have a black abdomen with two white marks. In mature females, the background colour of the abdomen can be red, yellow or white, with a black pattern which has been noted for a certain resemblance to the silhouette of Napoleon. Prosoma and legs are black or dark brown.

Like other species of the family Thomisidae, these spiders do not make a web, but actively hunt their prey.

Distribution

This species is present in most countries of Europe and in the eastern Palearctic realm, although absent from Scandinavia and the British Isles. It is especially common throughout the Mediterranean region.

Subspecies
 Synema globosum clarum (Franganillo, 1913) 
 Synema globosum flavum (Franganilo, 1913) 
 Synema globosum pulchellum (Franganillo, 1926)

References

 M.J. Roberts: Collins Field Guide: Spiders of Britain & Northern Europe. Ramsbury, Bath 1995
 A.S. Utochkin: Spiders of the genus Synaema, the group globosum (F.) in the USSR. Zoologicheskii Zhurnal 39: 1018-1024; Moskau 1960

Thomisidae
Spiders of Europe
Spiders described in 1775
Palearctic spiders
Taxa named by Johan Christian Fabricius